Jewel Lake is a former reservoir and artificial lake along Wildcat Creek, a small stream in Northern California in Tilden Regional Park. It is located in the Wildcat Canyon between the Berkeley Hills and Sobrante Ridge Hills in an unincorporated area closest to Richmond and Kensington, California geographically and Berkeley accessibly. A wooden raised walkway built in the 1970s runs over marshland to the south of the lake. The dam and abandoned flood control machinery are visible at the north end of the lake.

See also
List of lakes in California
List of lakes in the San Francisco Bay Area

Notes

External links

Tilden Regional Park
Reservoirs in Contra Costa County, California
Berkeley Hills
Lakes of the San Francisco Bay Area
Reservoirs in California
Reservoirs in Northern California
Former reservoirs